Palmer-Tomkinson may refer to
Charles Palmer-Tomkinson (born 1940), English landowner, former soldier and skier, a close friend of Charles, Prince of Wales
James Palmer-Tomkinson (1915–1952), British alpine skier
James Palmer-Tomkinson (1879–1961), British cricketer
Jeremy Palmer-Tomkinson (born 1943), English Olympian
Tara Palmer-Tomkinson (1971–2017), English socialite, "It girl", television presenter, and columnist

See also
Palmer (surname)
Tomkinson

Compound surnames
English-language surnames
Surnames of English origin